The Langhe Ceretto Prize (after Langhe region and Ceretto family of wine-makers) is a literary award, introduced in 1991 and bestowed by a jury of international experts to books dealing with food and viticulture.

Notes

External links
Books, awarded the Langhe Ceretto Prize

Food and drink literary awards
Awards established in 1991